Kim Eung-Ryong (born September 15, 1941, in Pyongwon, South Pyongan, Korea) is a Korean baseball manager. He is the winningest manager in the history of Korean professional baseball, having won ten Korean Series championships throughout his career. He was the manager of the Haitai Tigers (1983–2000), Samsung Lions (2001–2004), and Hanwha Eagles (2013–2014).

Biography 
He studied in the United States, attending Georgia Southern College, and then returned to Korea. He played outfield for the South Korea national baseball team in the 1962 Asian Baseball Championship, which ended up winning a Bronze Medal.

Kim managed the amateur baseball team sponsored by Haitai from 1964 to 1981. During that period he managed the South Korean team to its first international title in the 1977 Intercontinental Cup. He managed the national team to a Bronze Medal in the 1978 Amateur World Series.

Continuing his association with Haitai, Kim was hired by the professional KBO League Haitai Tigers in 1983. He won nine championships with the Tigers (1983, 1986–89, 1991, 1993, 1996–97). From 1986 to 1997 he led the Tigers to eight championships, never losing a Korean Series during that span.

Kim was the manager of the Bronze Medal-winning South Korea national baseball team in the 2000 Summer Olympics.

Leaving the Tigers after the 2001 season, Kim was hired by the Samsung Lions. During his four-year tenure with the team, he led them to the Korean Series three times, winning it once (in 2002).

Kim left managing in 2005, serving as president of the Samsung Lions until 2010, and then continuing on in an administrative role.

In 2016 Kim was hired as president of the Korea Baseball Softball Association.

Managerial record

References

External links 
 Retired player information from Korea Baseball Organization

South Korean corporate directors
Hanwha Eagles managers
Samsung Lions managers
South Korean baseball managers
South Korean baseball players
Baseball infielders
Olympic baseball managers
South Korea national baseball team managers
People from South Pyongan
1941 births
Living people